The Silver Spade was a giant power shovel used for strip mining in southeastern Ohio. Manufactured by Bucyrus-Erie, South Milwaukee, Wisconsin, the model 1950-B was one of two of this model built, the other being the GEM of Egypt. Its sole function was to remove the earth and rock overburden from the coal seam. Attempts to purchase and preserve the shovel from Consol to make it the centerpiece of a mining museum exhibit for $2.6 million fell short, and the shovel was dismantled in February 2007.

Facts and figures

 Began operations - November 1965
 Speed - 1/4 mph (400 m/h)
 Bucket capacity - 105 cu yd (80 m3)
 Operating weight - 14,000,000 lb (7,000 short tons, 6,400 metric tons)
 Height - 220 ft to top of boom (67 m)
 Boom length - 200 feet (61 m)
 Width - 59 ft (18 m)
 Height of crawlers - 8 ft (2.5 m)
 Length of crawlers - 34 ft (10 m)
 Maximum dumping height - 139 ft (42 m)
 Maximum dumping radius - 195 ft (59 m)
 Rating on A.C. motors - 13,500 hp (10.1 MW) peak
 Entire operation of the shovel is controlled by two hand levers and a pair of foot pedals.
 Digs 315,000 lb (143 metric tons) of earth in a single bite, swings 180° and deposits the load up to 390 ft (119 m) away from the digging points at heights up to 140 ft (42.5 m).
 Machine's four  hoist ropes total 3,000 ft (914 m) in length.
 Fourteen main digging cycle motors are capable of developing a combined peak of 13,500 hp (10.1 MW) at peak load.
 Automatically leveled through four  hydraulic jacks.
 Swings a 105 cubic yard (80 m3) dipper from a 200 ft (61 m) boom and a 122 ft (37 m) dipper handle.
 The "GEM of Egypt", the other large shovel, has similar statistics concerning size and weight, etc.  The primary difference is the bucket and boom.  The GEM is a 130 cubic-yard (99.4 m3) bucket and 170 ft (52 m) boom, while the Spade sports 105 cubic-yard (80 m3) bucket and 200 ft (61 m) boom.

Dipper arm
The design is unusual, as it uses a Knee action crowd, and only these two Bucyrus-Erie 1950-B's were fitted with this technology.  The technology was a requirement of the owners and had to be licensed from Marion Power Shovel, with Marion being allowed to use Bucyrus-Erie's cable crowd system in return.

See also
 Big Brutus
 Big Muskie
 Dragline
 Dumper truck
 Excavator
 Marion 6360

References

 Information about the Preservation Effort
 Extreme Mining Machines, by Keith Haddock, Pub by MBI,

External links 
 Silver Spade on the Road(date Unknown) The picture of The Silver Spade on the road was taken in April 2001 when the shovel was being moved across Route 519 in New Athens, Ohio
 Cable Blasted 2007
 Harrison Coal and Reclamation Park

Stripping shovels
Coal mining in Appalachia
Engineering vehicles
Mining in Ohio
Harrison County, Ohio
Bucyrus-Erie